The Mello-Moods were an American R&B musical ensemble, operating from the late 1940s to mid-1950s. 

Their members were Ray "Buddy" Wooten, Bobby Williams, Monteith P. "Monte" Owens, Alvin "Bobby" Baylor and Jimmy Bethea.  Composed of teenagers from Resurrection Catholic School in Harlem, the group's music was nonetheless focused on an adult market. After the band broke up in 1953, Baylor, Owens and Williams went on to join another band, The Solitaires.

Monte Owens died on March 3, 2011, in the Bronx, New York, after illness, at the age of 74.

Discography
The group released four records: two on the Red Robin label, and two on Prestige Records.
"How Could You" / "Where Are You (Now That I Need You)", Red Robin (105), released 1951.  This reached the Top 10 in the US Billboard R&B chart in 1952, and, according to Joel Whitburn, original copies have the highest cash value, $2000, of any record ever making the R&B chart.
"I Couldn't Sleep a Wink Last Night", Red Robin (104), released 1952
"Call on Me", Prestige Records (799), recorded in 1952, released 1952
"I'm Lost", Prestige Records (852), recorded in 1952, released 1953

References

External links
Biography of the Mello-Moods

American rhythm and blues musical groups
Musical groups disestablished in 1953